On 21 March 2014 the All India Forward Bloc released its first list of candidates for the 2014 Lok Sabha election. The list included candidates for 38 seats in West Bengal, Maharashtra, Assam, Uttar Pradesh, Bihar, Haryana, Jharkhand, Andaman and Nicobar Islands, Odisha, Rajasthan, Karnataka and Delhi. According to the party general secretary Debabrata Biswas the main objective of the party in the elections was "to strengthen and unite the Left, democratic and secular forces to achieve an alternative policy for reconstruction of the country".

Bihar
Pancham Lal joined the party on 18 March 2014, and was nominated for the Pataliputra seat. Lal had been a senior civil servant. He retired from his post as chief secretary in 2012. During his administrative career, he faced opposition from several different Chief Ministers as he criticised corruption and criminal links of state ministers. He had earlier been associated with the Indian National Congress and the Samajwadi Party. Commenting on his candidature, Lal stated that his foremost objective was not to win the Lok Sabha seat but "to raise the cause of the oppressed and weaker sections, who are exploited and victimized".

Karnataka
The party fielded G.R. Shivshankar, secretary of its Karnataka state unit, in the Bangalore South seat. He is the president of the labour wing of the party, the Trade Union Coordination Committee (TUCC).

Kerala
No candidates from Kerala were included in the first list released on 21 March 2014. On 11 March 2014 the party chairman K. Velappan Nair stated that the party would contest four seats in the state; Kollam, Idukki, Thrissur and Kannur. The All India Secretary of the party, G. Devarajan, would contest from Kollam, whilst no names were given for the three other seats. G. Devarajan would contested against the Left Democratic Front nominee and CPI(M) leader M.A. Baby and the United Democratic Front nominee N.K. Premachandran of the RSP. Three days later G. Devarajan stated that he would withdraw his candidature if the party was included in the LDF and that talks with CPI(M) were ongoing.

Maharashtra
The party fielded the candidacy of veteran pro-Vidarbha statehood leader Jambuwantrao Dhote in the Nagpur seat. Dhote had won the Nagpur seat in the 1971 election as an All India Forward Bloc candidate but had since contested on behalf of many other parties. Another pro-Vidarbha statehood leader, Sandesh Bhalekar from the Parivartan Morcha, was fielded by the party in the Ramtek seat. In a statement made in early February 2014, commenting on his return to the party, Dhote stated that the ambition of the All India Forward Bloc was to contest all ten Lok Sabha seats in Vidarbha. At the time he hinted that the party was seeking to establish a pre-poll pact with the Janata Dal (United), the Indian Union Muslim League and the Shivrajya Party. Dhote was elected deputy chairman of the party at its 17th congress in September 2013.

West Bengal
In West Bengal the party contests elections as part of the Left Front. In regards to the two West Bengal seats that it won in the 2009 election, the party decided to field incumbent parliamentarian Narahari Mahato in the Purulia seat whilst fielding a new candidate in the Cooch Behar seat.

List of candidates

References

 
Lists of Indian political candidates
Candidates in the Indian general election, 2014